"You've Got the Gun" is a song by Australian band Sherbet. It was released in October 1972 as the fourth and final single from Sherbet's debut studio album Time Change... A Natural Progression. The song was written by Sherbet band members Garth Porter, Clive Shakespeare, Daryl Braithwaite. The song reached at number 29 on Go-Set and number 27 on the Kent Music Report.

Track listing

Charts

Personnel 
 Alan Sandow – drums, percussion, bongoes, chimes
 Daryl Braithwaite – lead vocals, tambourine, tabla 
 Clive Shakespeare – guitar, vocals 
 Garth Porter – keyboards, clavinet, piano, lead vocals, backing vocals, Hammond organ, electric piano, synthesiser

References 

Sherbet (band) songs
1972 singles
1972 songs
Festival Records singles
Infinity Records singles
Songs written by Garth Porter
Songs written by Clive Shakespeare
Songs written by Daryl Braithwaite